Gerard Pieter de Kruijff (27 January 1890 in Buren – 16 October 1968 in Deventer) was a Dutch horse rider  who competed in the 1924 Summer Olympics and in the 1928 Summer Olympics.

In the 1924 Summer Olympics he won the gold medal in the team three-day event and placed thirteenth in the individual three-day event. Four years later he won again the gold medals in the team three-day event and in the individual three-day event he won the silver medal. In Amsterdam he also competed in the jumping events. In the individual jumping he finished in 27th place and the Dutch team placed tenth in the team jumping competition.

References

External links
profile

1890 births
1968 deaths
Dutch male equestrians
Event riders
Equestrians at the 1924 Summer Olympics
Equestrians at the 1928 Summer Olympics
Olympic equestrians of the Netherlands
Olympic gold medalists for the Netherlands
Olympic silver medalists for the Netherlands
Sportspeople from Buren
Olympic medalists in equestrian
Medalists at the 1928 Summer Olympics
Medalists at the 1924 Summer Olympics
20th-century Dutch people